Shirburn Castle is a Grade I listed, moated castle located at the village of Shirburn, near Watlington, Oxfordshire. Originally constructed in the fourteenth century, it was renovated and remodelled in the Georgian era by Thomas Parker, the first Earl of Macclesfield who made it his family seat, and altered further in the early nineteenth century. The Earls of Macclesfield remained in residence until 2004, and the castle is still (2022) owned by the Macclesfield family company. It formerly contained an important, early eighteenth century library which, along with several valuable paintings, remained in the ownership of the 9th Earl and were largely dispersed at auction following his departure from the property; notable among these items were George Stubbs's 1768 painting "Brood Mares and Foals", a record setter for the artist at auction in 2010, the Macclesfield Psalter, and personal correspondence of Sir Isaac Newton.

On account of its "fairy tale" external appearance and unmodernised interior, the castle has been used on occasion for film and television settings and is possibly best known to the outside world via that route, since it remains in private hands, no roads pass it, and it is generally not open to the public for visiting. In addition, any history of the castle is somewhat obscured by lack of permitted access to scholars of medieval architecture over the past one (to two) hundred years as well as by conflicting statements in available published accounts; these include that the present castle has Norman origins and/or is on the site of a Norman precursor (not supported by any evidence), that the castle is an early example of brick construction (based on a mis-interpretation), and that the castle was badly damaged during the English Civil War prior to its rebuilding in the eighteenth century (no evidence exists for this assertion). A further piece of apparently deliberate misinformation was a claim that "Shirburn Castle" was visited by a tutor of Dante at the end of the thirteenth century, before the present structure was known to exist; the 1802 document upon which this assertion was based was subsequently shown to be a forgery.

Description and history

Eleventh to thirteenth centuries
The land on which Shirburn resides was part owned the Norman nobleman Robert D'Oyly who accompanied William the Conqueror on his conquest of England in 1066. Various nineteenth century sources, stemming in the main from a short "History of Shirburn Castle" compiled by Lady Macclesfield in 1887, state that D'Oyly constructed a castle there, which was described as having been surrendered to Empress Matilda (or Maud) in 1141 as part of a ransom negotiation. Later one Warin(e) de Lisle (or de Insula), apparently possessed the estate; this Warin was executed at York in 1322 for taking part in an insurrection. Subsequently, his widow was pardoned and her late husband's lands restored; whether these included a Norman castle at Shirburn, or whether such a structure even existed in that form, has not been verified by subsequent researchers and may in fact simply reflect a  desire of the then occupants to claim a more ancient origin for the castle than was actually the case; the relevant chapter of the Victoria County History notes only the previous existence of a manor (West Shirburn, which together with its counterpart at East Shirburn formed the twin manors of the district), which belonged in the 13th century to Robert de Burghfield, "likely to have been on the site" of the present castle. A supposed account of a pre-1300 visit to a "castle" at Shirburn by Brunetto Latini, the tutor of Dante, also quoted in nineteenth century sources, was revealed as a forgery per a book published in 1948 (see relevant section of the Victoria County History, footnote 18).

1377-1716 (de Lisle/Quatremain/Fowler/Chamberlain/Gage era)
A "licence to crenellate" (generally interpreted as permission to build) the present castle was granted to the earlier Warin's grandson, Warin de Lisle in 1377, with actual construction taking place around 1378. The present, still moated, two-to-three storey building has a quadrangular form with four rounded corner towers. Rendered on the exterior (although the covering has now disappeared in places), it has been stated as being the earliest brick building in Oxfordshire, however this appears to be based on a misconception: Emery, cited below, believes that the original construction was probably built entirely in limestone, with the brick "casing" added only when the castle was remodelled in 1720 in the Georgian style. Emery writes:

Emery also compares and contrasts de Lisle's castle at Shirburn with that constructed a few years later by Sir Edward Dalyngrigge at Bodiam in Sussex, noting similarities in original architectural features but also that Shirburn "seems to have had less of a martial air than the castle at Bodiam", in particular that the "formidable twin-towered gate-house" at Bodiam presents a stronger front than its equivalent at Shirburn.

After de Lisle's death in 1382, the castle passed to his daughter, who married Lord Berkeley, and then to her daughter who married Richard Beauchamp, Earl of Warwick, whose principal residence was Warwick Castle. Later it was owned or occupied by successive families including the Talbots, Quartremayes [Quatremains] and Fowlers and eventually sold to the Chamberlain family, commencing with Edward Chamberlain, whose mother took out a lease on the Shirburn estate from her brother in 1505 and who died there in 1543. The castle's next owner was Sir Leonard Chamberlain (or Chamberlayne), d.1561, who was also the Governor of Guernsey from 1553. An account survives from 1559 documenting something of the internal layout of the rooms at that time, specifically: "the wardrobe, the entry, the great chamber at the lower end of the hall, the inner chamber, 'the brusshynge howse', the hall and the chamber over the parlour, and an inner chamber there; there was also a cellar, buttery, chambers each for the butler, priest, horse-keeper, cook, and chamberlains, an additional chamber, a low parlour, a kitchen larder, boulting house, fish-house, garner, brew-house, and other outhouses". During the 1642–1651 English Civil War Shirburn was held by Richard Chamberlain for the King, but was surrendered to Sir Thomas Fairfax for the Parliamentarian cause in 1646, apparently without damage.

After the end of the Civil War, the castle remained in (or was returned to) the Chamberlain family. The last male of the line, John Chamberlain, died in 1651, leaving no sons but two co-heirs, his daughters Elizabeth, wife of John Neville, Lord [A]bergavenny, and Mary, who was married first to Sir Thomas Gage of Firle, Sussex, and later to Sir Henry Goring. Elizabeth and Lord Abergavenny (d. 1662) possessed the manorial rights there until Elizabeth's death (date not known); by 1682 both Elizabeth and Mary had died and the castle passed to Joseph Gage (1652–1700), Mary's fourth son by her first husband, Thomas Gage.

The appearance of the castle prior to its sale to Parker in 1716 is not known in detail from contemporary accounts or illustrations; it does appear (as a small icon) on Robert Plot's 1677 "Map of Oxfordshire" (relevant portion reproduced at right), similar to the castle of today, although whether this is intended to be a "stock" castle representation or an actual likeness is unclear. Emery, 2006, suggests that many features of its original external and likely internal appearance probably would have resembled its near-contemporary at Bodiam in Sussex; unlike Bodiam and many other castles of the era, Shirburn appears to have survived the Civil War relatively unscathed, the Victoria County History stating that it was never besieged but surrendered at the time after appropriate terms had been negotiated.

The castle continued as the seat of that branch of the Gage family until 1714, when the eldest son Thomas Gage succeeded his wife Elizabeth's late father to the estate of High Meadow, a property in Gloucestershire, and associated "considerable fortune". He then decided to sell Shirburn.

1716-c.1800 (Parker era, first part)

In 1716 the castle was acquired by Thomas Parker (1666–1732), Baron (later to be the first Earl) of Macclesfield and subsequently Lord Chancellor of England from 1718 to 1725, the purchase price (for Shirburn plus another property, Clare manor) being £25,696 8s. 5d. (more than £2 million in recent money); Mowl and Earnshaw, cited below, state that according to "a manuscript
note made by Parker", the portion of the purchase price actually allocated to the castle exclusive of the grounds was £7,000, and that he also spent an additional £42,297 on the land needed for the park. From this date the castle became the seat of the Earls of Macclesfield (and/or their associated family company), until the present time. The then very wealthy, soon-to-be first Earl was responsible for extensive renovations to the castle (considered by most authors to be a substantial rebuild, see below), costing a further £5,000, and also started to accumulate the castle's extensive and important library, which survived intact for almost 300 years until its dispersal.

The Earls of Macclesfield are (or at least were) protective of their privacy, allowing few visitors to see the inside of the castle and denying requests for access for an examination to scholars of medieval architecture, with the result that Anthony Emery wrote in 2006: "Shirburn Castle has a well deserved reputation for being barred to all students of architecture ...Consequently, the castle has never been studied in detail ...The list [of persons denied entry] extends from Lord Torrington in 1775 to Nikolaus Pevsner, the architectural staff of Country Life, and the Department of the Environment recorders 200 years later. ...Not surprisingly, Shirburn has been ignored by all writers on castles except for the summaries of ownership by Sir James Mackenzie, The Castles of England, 1 (1897) 163-5 and Sir Charles Oman, Castles (1926) 46-9". (It should also be noted that the list of excluded persons also included Emery himself, who was unable to report further on the interior.) The medieval entrance hall, a surviving room from the pre-eighteenth century castle, was previously illustrated by J. Skelton "after F. Mackenzie" and published in Skelton's Antiquities of Oxfordshire in 1824 (see "external links").

Emery postulates that after Thomas Parker purchased the castle in 1716, the latter's renovations probably affected more than three-quarters of the building, with the result that what stands at Shirburn today is "essentially an eighteenth-century interpretation of the medieval castle, following its original plan", although he allows that survivals from the original fourteenth-century structure include a "reasonable amount of the west range" (which would include the bulk of the main gate tower), the lower stages of two corner towers, and "possibly some ground-level walling internally", although he was unable to inspect the latter in person. The Victoria County History also suggests that: "The present south range may represent the medieval south range, with new windows inserted and with another range of rooms added to the south, outside the original outer wall." In a 1981 paper discussing the architecture of the present castle, authors Timothy Mowl and Brian Earnshaw suggest that the eighteenth-century rebuild intentionally incorporated round-arched, or neo-Norman, expressions of medievalism, "probably to assert a link with a supposed Norman foundation." The same authors also point to Vanbrugh Castle, a London house designed and built by John Vanbrugh in 1719 for his own family, as a similar expression of neo-medievalism of around the same date, again with rounded windows, in contrast to the more pointed windows associated with the mid-18th century "Gothick" style of a few decades later. The rounded window style appears to have been used consistently in the Parker-era rebuild or renovation, including in all of the surviving inward-facing walls surrounding the courtyard, although from 1830, the effect was masked by the incorporation of more "standard" segmental-headed sash windows in the new external additions along several frontages. Considering all of the accounts presently available, it would seem to be the case that, at a time when his contemporaries had most recently been constructing their new country houses in the English Baroque style (or even neo-medieval, in the case of Vanbrugh Castle), Parker decided to purchase an actual, habitable 14th-century castle and construct his new residence entirely within it, at the same time adding new windows to the surviving medieval walls and towers in the Georgian style.

Among the household of Thomas Parker, the 1st Earl, was his friend, the Welsh mathematician William Jones (1675–1749), close friend of Sir Isaac Newton and Sir Edmund Halley, who acted as tutor to Parker's son George, the future second Earl. Jones had earlier acquired the extensive library and archive of the mathematician John Collins (1625–1683), which contained several of Newton's letters and papers written in the 1670s, and later edited and published many of Newton's manuscripts. His collection of books and papers eventually passed into the Earl's library and was passed down through the Parker family until the 2000s; the Newton-associated items were eventually sold to the Cambridge University Library (see below).

George Parker, the 2nd Earl of Macclesfield (c.1695–1764) resided at Shirburn and inherited the earldom and the castle upon his father's death in 1732. He was celebrated as an astronomer and spent much time conducting astronomical observations at Shirburn, where he built an observatory and a chemical laboratory. The observatory was "equipped with the finest existing instruments" and the 2nd Earl used it from 1740. In 1761 the astronomer Thomas Hornsby observed the transit of Venus from the castle grounds. A 1778 mezzotint by James Watson, a copy of which is now in the National Maritime Museum, shows the 2nd Earl's two astronomical assistants, Thomas Phelps and John Bartlett, at work in the observatory.

c.1800-current (Parker era, second part)

In the early years of the 19th century, additional works were carried out, among them the (re)construction of the west access stairway and addition of the fine Regency drawbridge, (visible by 1818 in the engraving by J. Neale) and the roofing over of the courtyard at a low level, providing additional internal ground floor and basement space. The Victoria County History entry for the castle states: "In 1830 a fairly extensive modernization was undertaken—a drawing-room and library over it were added on the north side; the old north library over the hall was converted into a billiard room; the former drawing-room which had been over the dining-room on the east side was converted into a larger bedroom and a dressing-room; and the baths on the ground floor on the north side were removed. In 1870 the red-brick water tower adjoining the laundry was built and in 1873 the warder's room in the north-west tower and the low entresol above it were thrown into one to make a smoking-room." It is also apparent that the 19th century additions involved construction of extended outer sections of the north, east and south facades, which now display numerous rectangular sash windows of the Victorian style as opposed to the rounded Georgian windows of the 18th century makeover (the latter can still be seen to be present on the walls facing the internal courtyard, however, as evidenced by the aerial footage shown in the "external links" section).

J.P. Neale, in his 1847 "Mansions of England" work, had to rely for his description of the interior on an account by J.N. Brewer from 1813, who wrote:

At least one Victorian visitor, Edward Edwards, appears to have been granted access to the library (in fact two libraries, North and South), who presented a quite detailed account of its principal contents in the relevant chapter of his 1864 publication Libraries and Founders of Libraries, together with the activities of the Earls of Macclesfield up to that date (refer Bibliography). An early 20th-century photograph showing the interior of the South Library while it still contained its complement of books is reproduced in Mark Purcell's 2019 book, "The Country House Library", which also covers the content of the library in some more detail.

One other record of a successful 19th century visit survives, in the form of Walter Money's report "A Walk to Shirburn Castle", from the Journal of the British Archaeological Association for December 1895, which describes the interior in some detail from p. 290 onwards, especially with regard to some particular items of interest in the armoury, plus an extensive list of the more important portraits and other pictures to be seen in various rooms, together with a description and illustration of a Roman sarcophagus originally found in the garden, being used as a pedestal. A more recent, detailed account is contained in the 2003 litigation of Macclesfield v. Parker, and is included in full below.

The external gatehouse, providing vehicular access to the castle from Castle Road, is stated as being a nineteenth century creation, in the gothic style, and is Grade II listed.

With the exception of the 5th Earl, who was blind and chose to remain at his early home at Eynsham Hall, subsequent earls all resided at the castle, including Thomas Parker, the 3rd Earl (1723–1795), a Fellow of the Royal Society; George Parker, the 4th Earl (1755–1842), Comptroller of the Royal Household, Captain of the Yeomen of the Guard and a Fellow of the Royal Society; Thomas Augustus Parker, the 6th Earl (1811–1896), George Loveden Parker, the 7th Earl (1888–1975) and George Roger Parker, the 8th Earl (1914–1992), culminating with his son Richard Timothy George Mansfield Parker, 9th Earl of Macclesfield (b. 1943).

Ownership and occupancy issues and dispute, and sale of contents

To reduce future tax liabilities, in 1922 ownership of the castle was transferred from the Seventh Earl, George Loveden Parker to the Beechwood Estates Company (the Macclesfield family estate management company), with equity divided among the family members. Unfortunately for the succession, however, this had the result of decoupling ownership and the automatic right to occupy the castle from inheritance of the title, and in the early 21st century, following a long-running and acrimonious court battle, Richard Timothy George Mansfield Parker, the 9th Earl of Macclesfield and last member of the family to reside at the castle, was evicted from the family seat by the other family members, departing in 2005: the 9th Earl contending that a "draft lease" gave him the right to occupy the whole of the castle—or at least a portion of it—for his lifetime in exchange for an appropriate rent payable to the family company (of which the terms were yet to be agreed), however this was contested, ultimately successfully, by the company who contended that he was "no more than [a] tenant at will [of the company]", whose tenancy could therefore be terminated. The 9th Earl lost the occupancy of the house, but retained ownership of the contents (gifted to him in 1967 by his grandfather, the Seventh Earl) including three libraries containing many rarities among their more than 30,000 volumes, largely assembled by the first two Earls of Macclesfield in the first part of the 18th century.

Following his departure from the castle, the 9th Earl made the decision to sell the contents of the libraries, as well as some other items from the castle's holdings. The library items were prepared for a series of auctions, and were catalogued for the first time by staff from Sotheby's in 2004; among the most notable items discovered were a first edition of Copernicus's 1543 landmark work "On the Revolutions of the Celestial Spheres", annotated by the celebrated 17th-century Oxford mathematician John Greaves, which sold at auction for £666,400, and a unique and superbly illustrated 252-page 14th-century illuminated manuscript, the Macclesfield Psalter, now in the Fitzwilliam Museum in Cambridge. Other items originally forming part of the library were a collection of Welsh material which went to form part of the foundation collections of the National Library of Wales, correspondence of Sir Isaac Newton and other scientific papers which were sold to Cambridge University Library, and manuscripts including the original of the "Shirburn Ballads" (previously transcribed and published in 1907) and the Macclesfield Alphabet Book, now in the British Library. The breaking up and dispersal by auction of the library was lamented by some, including Roger Gaskell and Patricia Fara, who in 2005 wrote: "Now, without any public discussion, the Macclesfield Library is being broken up. Far more than simply a collection of old books belonging to one man, it is a fabulous treasure trove containing many of the most significant books, owned and annotated by several leading British figures in the history of European science... Formed in the 17th and 18th centuries, this is a coherent collection that was the working library of an intellectual and scientific powerhouse." On completion of the initial round of 6 sales of the scientific portion of the collection, Sotheby's issued a 2005 press release indicating that the sale process had thus far realised in excess of £14 million (not including The Macclesfield Psalter, which sold separately for £1,685,600), representing "the highest total ever for any sale of scientific books and manuscripts". Additional parts of the library sold by Sotheby's between 2006 and 2008, under the general heading "The Library of the Earls of Macclesfield, Removed from Shirburn Castle", comprised "Bibles 1477-1739" (part 7), "Theology, Philosophy, Law, and Economics" (part 8, which realised £1.3 million), "Voyages Travel and Atlases" (part 9), "Applied Arts and Sciences, including Military and Naval Books" (part 10), "English Books and Manuscripts" (part 11) and "Continental Books and Manuscripts" (part 12, which realised £1.8 million). Further selections from the library were offered at auction by Maggs Brothers, U.K. in 2010 and 2012. A set of 328 bound theology volumes acquired from the Macclesfield collection sale now forms part of the Kinlaw Library at Asbury University, a private Christian university in Wilmore, Kentucky, U.S.A.

The castle contents also included a number of fine paintings, one of which, George Stubbs's 1768 masterpiece "Brood Mares and Foals", subsequently sold at auction in 2010 for £10,121,250, a record price for the British artist. This painting was visible, in passing, on the wall in a room at the castle used for filming in the 1992 episode "Happy families" of the Inspector Morse TV series (see below). Previously, a 1740 William Hogarth portrait of the second Earl's tutor and mathematician William Jones, was sold at auction in 1984 for £280,000, and is now in the National Portrait Gallery. Earlier in 1998, an extremely fine Georgian silver wine set, the only known complete example of its era to survive, had been sold by Christies and is now in the Victoria and Albert Museum, its purchase assisted by a £750,000 grant from the National Heritage Memorial Fund.

Since the departure of the 9th Earl, the castle appears to have remained largely vacant and, at that time, in need of substantial repairs (estimated as "some £2.6 million" in 2003). Subsequently, the owners have started to address this aspect, commissioning replacement of a number of sections of the roof and treatment of associated timbers, as documented by the contractors concerned. Although its name is not mentioned, the castle is also recognisably one of several offered as "castle" film locations as described via the Location Works agency.

The park
The castle sits within extensive grounds (Shirburn Park, itself Grade II listed), which is described in more detail at the relevant "Historic England" listing, with the brief description "Later C18 and early C19 garden and pleasure grounds around a late C14 castle, remodelled 1720s and early C19, set in a landscape park incorporating the remains of an early to mid C18 formal layout." It incorporates a rotunda and a former orangery, the latter now derelict. Mowl and Earnshaw note that the development of the gardens was probably unfinished on account of Thomas Parker's well known downfall and financial troubles from 1725 onwards, and that further developments were likely undertaken by the second Earl in a classical style, forming a stylistic contrast with what they characterise as the neo-Medieval nature of the first Earl's renovated castle.

Use as film location
On account of its "fairy tale" appearance, romantic setting, and near-original condition Georgian/Victorian interior, the castle has been used as a film location on a number of occasions, including external, and some internal shots as the Balcombe family home in the 1992 episode "Happy Families" of the Inspector Morse TV series, internal rooms, the gatehouse entrance and the church as Midsomer Priory for a 2011 episode "A Sacred Trust" of the Midsomer Murders TV series (although exterior shots of the "priory" house feature Greys Court, another Oxfordshire location), as well as an exterior shot of Mycroft Holmes's country estate for the 2011 film Sherlock Holmes: A Game of Shadows. The location has also been used in 2 episodes of Poirot, namely "Third Girl" (2008) and "Curtain: Poirot's Last Case" (2013); in Annie: A Royal Adventure! (1995 TV movie), Philomena (2013), in the TV serial London Spy (2015) and—with a certain amount of digital manipulation to remove post-medieval alterations—in The Old Guard (2020). A 2016 Burberry commercial, "The Tale of Thomas Burberry" was also mainly filmed at Shirburn Castle. In the 2011 Midsomer Murders Episode "A Sacred Trust", the coat of arms of the fictitious Vertue family, Lords of the Manor and as represented in the supposedly local pub "The Vertue Arms", is constructed almost identically to that of the (real) Parker family, Earls of Macclesfield and owners of the film location for the fictitious priory at Shirburn Castle.

Bibliography
 Edwards, Edward (1864): Libraries and Founders of Libraries. Chapter X. The Life of Thomas Parker, Earl of Macclesfield; - The Life of Nicholas Joseph Foucault; - and the Library at Shirburn Castle in Oxfordshire (p. 327 ff.). Available at https://www.google.com.au/books/edition/Libraries_and_founders_of_libraries/7SYCAAAAQAAJ
 Gaskell, Roger & Fara, Patricia (2005): Selling the silver: country house libraries and the history of science. Endeavour 29(1): 14-19. . doi:10.1016/j.endeavour.2005.01.005
 
 
 [Victoria County History]: 'Parishes: Shirburn', in A History of the County of Oxford: Volume 8, Lewknor and Pyrton Hundreds, ed. Mary D Lobel (London, 1964), pp. 178-198. British History Online http://www.british-history.ac.uk/vch/oxon/vol8/pp178-198 [accessed 18 October 2022].

Notes

References

External links 
 
 Shirburn Castle and Village in 1736 - simplification of part of an estate map by William Burgess. Illustration from relevant Victoria County History entry at Parishes: Shirburn | British History Online.
 A 1787 engraving of the exterior of the castle, published in the series "Harrison's Seats", reproduced on www.rareoldprints.com
 J. Skelton, "Shirburn Castle, Oxfordshire" (engraving published in Skelton's Antiquities of Oxfordshire 1824) - reproduction on Sanders of Oxford Antique Prints and Maps website
 J. Skelton, "Ancient Entrance Hall of Shirburn Castle" (engraving published in Skelton's Antiquities of Oxfordshire 1824) - reproduction on B.B. Williams "Antique Prints & Maps" website
 Shirburn Castle (exterior) in 1900 - image at Country Life Picture Library
 Another early 20th century photograph of the castle on Flickr (further details unknown)
 A 1969 photograph of the castle, showing a different view of the drawbridge, and the appearance of the west front before the deterioration of the external render
 Album of exterior photographs by Matthew Emmett in 2014 on flickr.com
 Shirburn Castle - aerial view via Google Maps
 A fine aerial view of the castle taken in 2010, posted on Flickr by AirFrame Photography
 Helifilms Video flypast/aerial view of Shirburn Castle available via Getty Images
 The Daily Telegraph, 20 February 2004: "Feud forces sale of 'intellectual time capsule'" (subscription required)
 The rotunda and the derelict orangery in the castle grounds, photographed in August 2019 (photograph by Tom Cowell)
 Blog post on Shirburn Castle, from the series "Handed On" (handedon.wordpress.com/)
 Filming locations for the 1992 Inspector Morse episode "Happy Families", including some external and internal views of the castle plus this external view of the castle taken in 1898 submitted by a subscriber
 Filming locations for the 2013 movie "Philomena" - some taken on the Shirburn estate
 Filming locations used for "London Spy", including a number of exterior and interior shots of the castle
 Shirburn Castle as it appears as a location backdrop in the 2020 movie "The Old Guard"; the rounded, 18th-century windows in the towers, plus their rectangular later equivalents in the connecting walls have been digitally replaced by smaller openings more appropriate to the medieval period (for their actual appearance compare this photograph.

Astronomical observatories in England
Castles in Oxfordshire
Grade I listed houses in Oxfordshire
Grade I listed castles